All the Room (1964) is the third poetry collection by Australian poet David Rowbotham.  It won the Grace Leven Prize for Poetry in 1964.

The collection consists of 49 poems, the majority of which were previously published in various Australian poetry and general magazines, with some published here for the first time.

Contents

Critical reception
In his review of the poetry collection in The Age Dennis Douglas noted "In Rowbotham's poetry technique counts far more than content", though he does go on to say the poet's "words can attain a startling freshness." He also concluded that "David Rowbotham seems to be seeking a new subject-matter and a new style."

Vivian Smith in The Bulletin found Rowbotham "striking out in new directions." He went on: "Rowbotham's strength has always been that of simple affection for and appreciation of country life and living. His tone is subdued, unassertive. One feels that he would rather not be heard than have to raise his voice."

Awards
 1964 - winner Grace Leven Prize for Poetry

See also
 1964 in Australian literature
 1964 in poetry

References

1964 poetry books
Australian poetry collections